QCHS may refer to:

 Queen Creek High School, a public secondary school in Queen Creek, Arizona
 Quigley Catholic High School, a defunct high school in Baden, Pennsylvania